Washington Park may refer to the following, all in the United States:

Communities
 Washington Park, Arizona
 Washington Park, Florida
 Washington Park, Illinois
 Washington Park, New Jersey
 Washington Park, North Carolina
 Washington Park, Roanoke, Virginia
 Washington Park, Seattle, Washington

Community areas and parks

 Washington Park, Denver, Colorado, listed on the National Register of Historic Places (NRHP)
 Washington Park, Atlanta, Georgia
 Washington Park, Chicago (disambiguation)
 Washington Park (Springfield, Illinois), NRHP-listed
 Washington Park (East Chicago), Indiana
 Washington Park (Michigan City, Indiana), NRHP-listed
 Washington Park (Dubuque, Iowa), NRHP-listed
 Washington Park (Newark), New Jersey, NRHP-listed
 Washington Park Historic District (Albany, New York)
 Washington Park, a municipal park in Brooklyn, New York, later renamed Fort Greene Park
 Washington Park, a private park in the Central Troy Historic District in Troy, New York
 Washington Park (Cincinnati, Ohio)
 Washington Park (Portland, Oregon)
 Washington Park, Providence, Rhode Island, a community area that formerly was a race track
 Washington Park, Milwaukee, Wisconsin - see Parks of Milwaukee

Sports facilities
 Washington Park (Los Angeles), California, a former baseball park
 Washington Park Race Track, former horse racing facility in Cook County, Illinois
 Washington Park (Indianapolis), Indiana, two former baseball parks
 Washington Park (baseball), former major league baseball parks in Brooklyn, New York

Transportation
Washington Park station (MetroLink), in East St. Louis, Illinois
Washington Park station (Newark Light Rail), in Newark, New Jersey
Washington Park station (Portland), in Portland, Oregon

Other uses
Washington Park Handicap, an American Thoroughbred horse race
Washington Park High School, Racine, Wisconsin

See also
Fort Washington Park, Maryland
One Washington Park, a building in Newark, New Jersey
Washington Park Historic District (disambiguation)